Salar (Persian: سالار) is a Persian name common in Iran, Kurdistan, Azerbaijan and Afghanistan. Notable people with this name include:

 Salar Abdoh, Iranian novelist
 Salar Afrasiabi, Iranian midfielder
 Salar Aghili, Iranian traditional singer
 Salar Ayoubi, Iranian oud player 
 Salar Radjabi, Iranian Agra-Ingenieure
 Salar Azimi, Iranian refugee and businessman
 Salar Kamangar, Iranian-American Google executive
 Salar Moghadam, Iranian singer and composer
 Salar Shahna, Swiss-Iranian film and VR producer

See also 
 Salar (disambiguation)

References

Persian masculine given names